Gerald Abrahams (15 April 1907 – 15 March 1980) was an English chess player, author, and barrister.

Chess career

He is best known for the Abrahams Defence of the Semi-Slav, also known as the Abrahams–Noteboom Variation, or the Noteboom Variation:
1.d4 d5 2.c4 c6 3.Nc3 e6 4.Nf3 dxc4 5.e3 b5 6.a4 Bb4 7.Bd2 a5 8.axb5 Bxc3 9.Bxc3 cxb5 10.b3 Bb7 (ECO D31).

In 1933 he was third at Hastings in the British Championship, after Mir Sultan Khan and Theodore Tylor.

Abrahams was known as a strong blindfold player. In 1934 he took on four strong Irish players, playing blindfold, at the Belgravia Hotel in Belfast, winning two games and drawing two.

In the Anglo-Soviet radio match of 1946 he scored one win and one draw against Viacheslav Ragozin on board 10.

Author
Abrahams was the author of several chess books, including Teach Yourself Chess (1948),The Chess Mind (1951), Handbook of Chess (1960), Technique in Chess (1961), Test Your Chess (1963), The Pan Book of Chess (1966), Not Only Chess (1974), and Brilliancies in Chess (1977).
Bridge
Brains in Bridge (1962)

Legal, Philosophical and Political
Law Affecting Police and Public (1938)
Law Relating to Hire Purchase (1939)
Ugly Angel (1940)
Retribution (1941)
Day of Reckoning (1943)
World Turns Left (1943)
Conscience Makes Heroes (1945)
Lunatics and Lawyers (1951)
Law for Writers and Journalists (1958)
According to the Evidence (1958)
The Legal Mind (1954)
Police Questioning: The Judges' Rules (1964)
Trade Unions and the Law (1968)
Morality and the Law (1971).

Religion
The Jewish Mind (1961)

Geography/History
Let's Look at Israel (1966)

Political views
Abrahams was a Liberal in a period of low success for that party in Britain, the period from 1920-1960, and stood in the Sheffield Hallam constituency garnering 7.7% of the vote in 1945, after four national elections in which no Liberal had stood for the seat.

External links
165 Games of Gerald Abrahams at ChessGames.com
Gerald Abrahams and the blindfold exhibition
Remembering Gerald Abrahams (15-iv-1907 15-iii-1980)

1907 births
1980 deaths
English Jews
English chess players
Jewish chess players
20th-century English writers
20th-century English male writers
British chess writers
Liberal Party (UK) parliamentary candidates
Contract bridge writers
20th-century chess players